Lecithocera xanthocosma is a moth in the family Lecithoceridae. It was described by Edward Meyrick in 1923. It is found in Uganda.

The wingspan is 19–21 mm. The forewings are dark purple-fuscous and the hindwings are dark fuscous.

References

Moths described in 1923
xanthocosma
Moths of Africa
Taxa named by Edward Meyrick